Jerry Butler Jr. (born December 8, 1939) is an American soul singer-songwriter, producer, musician, and retired politician. He was the original lead singer of the R&B vocal group the Impressions, inducted into the Rock and Roll Hall of Fame in 1991. After leaving the group in 1960, Butler achieved over 55 Billboard Pop and R&B Chart hits as a solo artist including "He Will Break Your Heart", "Let It Be Me" and "Only the Strong Survive". He was inducted into the National Rhythm & Blues Hall of Fame in 2015.

He served as a Commissioner for Cook County, Illinois, from 1985 to 2018. As a member of this 17-member county board, he chaired the Health and Hospitals Committee and served as Vice Chair of the Construction Committee.

Biography

Early life
Butler was born in Sunflower, Mississippi, United States, in 1939. When Butler was three years old, the family moved to Chicago, Illinois, and he grew up in the Cabrini–Green housing projects. The mid-1950s had a profound effect on Butler's life. He performed in a church choir with Curtis Mayfield. As a teenager, Butler sang in a gospel quartet called Northern Jubilee Gospel Singers, along with Mayfield. Mayfield, a guitar player, became the lone instrumentalist for the six-member Roosters group, which later became The Impressions. Inspired by Sam Cooke and the Soul Stirrers, the Five Blind Boys of Mississippi, and the Pilgrim Travelers, getting into the music industry seemed inevitable.

Butler's younger brother, Billy Butler, also had a career in the music industry, including playing guitar with Jerry's band, until his death in 2015.

Early recordings

Butler co-wrote the song "For Your Precious Love" (which is ranked No. 327 on the Rolling Stone magazine's list of The 500 Greatest Songs of All Time) and wanted to record a disc. Looking for recording studios, the Impressions (the original members of which were Butler, Curtis Mayfield, Sam Gooden, Fred Cash - who left early on, and later returned - and brothers Arthur and Richard Brooks), auditioned for Chess Records and Vee-Jay Records. The group eventually signed with Vee-Jay, where they released "For Your Precious Love" in 1958.  It became The Impressions' first hit and gold record.

Solo career
Butler was dubbed the "Iceman" by WDAS Philadelphia disc jockey, Georgie Woods, while performing in a Philadelphia theater.

He released as a single "He Will Break Your Heart" in 1960, and the song peaked at No. 7 on the Billboard pop chart. Butler's co-wrote, with Otis Redding, the song "I've Been Loving You Too Long" in 1965. Butler's solo career had a string of hits, including the Top 10 successes "He Will Break Your Heart", "Find Another Girl", "I'm A-Telling You" (all written by fellow Impression Curtis Mayfield and featuring Mayfield as harmony vocal), the million selling "Only the Strong Survive", "Moon River", "Need To Belong" (recorded with the Impressions after he went solo), "Make It Easy on Yourself", "Let It Be Me" (with Betty Everett), "Brand New Me", "Ain't Understanding Mellow" (with Brenda Lee Eager), "Hey, Western Union Man", and "Never Give You Up". His 1969 "Moody Woman" release became a Northern Soul favourite and featured at number 369 in the Northern Soul Top 500.  Butler released two successful albums, The Ice Man Cometh (1968) and Ice on Ice (1969). He collaborated on many of his successful recordings with the Philadelphia-based songwriting team Gamble and Huff.  With Motown, in 1976 and 1977, Butler produced and co-produced (with Paul David Wilson) two albums: Suite for the Single Girl and It All Comes Out in My Song.

Tony Orlando and Dawn revived "He Will Break Your Heart" in 1975, with a new title, "He Don't Love You (Like I Love You)", and it was more successful than Butler's original (#7), going to number one on the US Billboard Hot 100.

Subsequently, Butler and P.D. Wilson produced an album with Dee Dee Sharp-Gamble on Philadelphia International Records. In 1981, "Breaking and Entering" / "Easy Money" was released from Sharp-Gamble's album Dee Dee.

1980s–2018
Butler continued to perform while serving as a Cook County Board Commissioner before retiring from public office in 2018. As Cook County Commissioner, Butler voted to uphold a historic 2008 Cook County sales tax increase, which remains the highest in the nation.  As a result, the Chicago Tribune encouraged people to vote against him in the 2010 elections. Butler, however, won reelection in March 2014 with over 80 percent of the vote.

In recent years, he has served as host of PBS TV music specials such as Doo Wop 50 and 51, Rock Rhythm and Doo Wop, and Soul Spectacular: 40 years of R&B, among others. He has also served as chairman of the board of the Rhythm and Blues Foundation. In 1991, Butler was inducted, along with the other original members of the Impressions (Curtis Mayfield, Sam Gooden, Fred Cash, and Arthur and Richard Brooks), into the Rock and Roll Hall of Fame. Butler released Time & Faith in 1992.

The Hives covered "Find Another Girl" on their 2000 album Veni Vidi Vicious. The Black Keys covered "Never Give You Up" on their 2010 album, Brothers.

Personal life
He currently resides in Chicago. His wife Annette, originally one of his backup singers, died in 2019. 

Since his 1991 induction into the Rock and Roll Hall of Fame as a member of the Impressions, music writers and critics have stated that Butler also deserves a second induction as a solo artist, based upon his successful career as a recording artist and songwriter after leaving that group.

Discography

Singles

See also
R&B number-one hits of 1960 (USA)
R&B number-one hits of 1961 (USA)
R&B number-one hits of 1968 (USA)
R&B number-one hits of 1969 (USA)
List of soul musicians

References

Bibliography
Pruter, Robert. Chicago Soul. Urbana, IL: University of Illinois Press, 1991,

External links
 Mississippi musicians: Jerry Butler.  Erica Covin
 Jerry Butler Biography on VH1.com
 Jerry Butler on Philly Soul Classics
 "The History Makers: Jerry Butler

1939 births
Living people
People from Sunflower, Mississippi
African-American people in Illinois politics
20th-century African-American male singers
American soul musicians
Mercury Records artists
Singers from Chicago
Singers from Mississippi
Philadelphia International Records artists
Members of the Cook County Board of Commissioners
The Impressions members
Vee-Jay Records artists
American baritones
Alligator Records artists